Ajj De Ranjhe  is a 2012 Punjabi film starring Aman Dhaliwal, Gurleen Chopra, Gurpreet Ghuggi, Kimi Verma, Kul Sidhu, Rana Ranbir. The movie is directed by Manmohan Singh. The movie was released on 7 September 2012.

Plot
Ajj De Ranjhe is a satirical take on the state of the youth law and order system of Punjab.

The film follows the journey of an unemployed youngster Ambar (Aman Dhaliwal) and a rookie cop Manjeet (Gurpreet Ghuggi). While Ambar hopes to make it as a TV journalist like his idol and romantic interest Kranti (Gurleen Chopra), Ghuggi is a dedicated cop, committed to clean up the messy state of affairs of his police station and bring a known local criminal Soocha Singh (Deep Dhillon) and his son to justice.

On their quest both Manjeet and Ambar encounter hilarious situations involving their romantic interests, family members, the people of the village & even gangsters. They both keep crossing paths at various junctures as the story progresses and eventually become a formidable team ready to take on the system.

Will this unlikely duo succeed in achieving their individual goals using unconventional tactics forms the rest of the story.

Set in the heartland of Punjab, Ajj De Ranjhe is a comedy blended with action, romance, songs and picturesque locations for good measure.

Cast
 Aman Dhaliwal as Ambar
 Gurpreet Ghuggi as Manjeet Singh Warraich 
 Kimi Verma as NRI woman
 Gurleen Chopra as Kranti (Day and Night News channel Reporter)
 Kul Sidhu as lady constable
 Rana Ranbir as constable
 Deep Dhillon

References

External links
 Ajj De Ranjhe Review 
 Ajj De Ranjhe at Cinema Punjabi
  Ajj De Ranjhe - PlanetPunjab.com \
 Punjabgold.com

2012 films
Punjabi-language Indian films
2010s Punjabi-language films
Reliance Entertainment films